Chrztowo  is a village with a population of 80 in northern Poland. The village is within the administrative district of Gmina Liniewo, which is within Kościerzyna County, in the provincial region of the Pomeranian Voivodeship. It lies approximately 5 km (3 mi.) south-west of Liniewo, 14 km (9 mi.) south-east of Kościerzyna, and 46 hm (29 mi.) southwest of the regional capital, Gdańsk.

See also
History of Pomerania

References

Chrztowo